The Baltimore riots of 1919 were a series of riots connected to the Red Summer of 1919. As more and more African-Americans moved from the south to the industrial north they started to move into predominantly white neighborhoods. This change in the racial demographics of urban areas increased racial tension that occasionally boiled over into civil unrest.

July Riot
The Haynes' report, as summarized in the New York Times, lists a race riot as taking place on July 11.

October Riot
Another Baltimore riot occurred between 11 PM October 1, 1919, until 2 AM October 2. It is at the end of the Red Summer riots of 1919. A small group of soldiers from Fort Meade (one paper says 4, another 7) were walking near Eastern avenue and Spring street when a bottle was thrown from a house hit one of them. "The doughboys began yelling at the negroes and daring them to leave their homes." There was fear that a riot would develop. Baltimore police were called and they forced the soldiers to leave the area.

An hour later they returned "with fifty or sixty more" and began shooting at any black person they encountered. When the police arrived, they shot at the soldiers. A riot call produced "two patrol loads" of police.  Four soldiers were arrested and the others withdrew. They returned half an hour later in greater numbers and "charged along Eastern Avenue". They were met by the police "with heavy clubs". Two more soldiers were arrested, and order was restored.

The six men arrested were ordered to pay small fines by Magistrate Gerecht in Baltimore's Eastern Police Court.

Aftermath

These confrontations were among numerous incidents of civil unrest that began in the so-called Red Summer of 1919. The Summer consisted of attacks on black communities in more than three dozen cities and counties. In most cases, white mobs attacked black neighborhoods. In some cases, black community groups resisted the attacks, especially in Chicago and Washington, D.C. Most deaths occurred in rural areas during events such as the Elaine Race Riot in Arkansas, where an estimated 100 to 240 black people and 5 white people were killed. Also occurring in 1919 was the Chicago Race Riot and Washington D.C. race riot which killed 38 and 39 people respectively, both having many more non-fatal injuries and extensive property damage.

See also
New London Naval riots of 1919
Mass racial violence in the United States
List of incidents of civil unrest in the United States

Bibliography
Notes

References

October 1919 events
Riots and civil disorder in Baltimore
African-American history in Baltimore
White American riots in the United States
Red Summer